Wang Jiafan (September 22, 1938 – July 7, 2020) was a Chinese historian specializing in economic and social history of China and Jiangnan regional history. He was a professor and doctoral supervisor at East China Normal University.

Biography
Wang Jiafan was born in the town of Chenmu (now Jinxi), Kunshan, Jiangsu, on September 22, 1938. He attended Chenmu Central Primary School. He elementary studied at Chenmu Middle School and secondary studied at Kunshan High School. In 1957 he was accepted to East China Normal University, where he majored in history. After graduation, he taught at the university. He was promoted to associate professor in 1986 and to full professor in 1992. In 2012, he was employed as a librarian of Shanghai Literature and History Research Museum. On July 7, 2020, he died at Huashan Hospital, in Shanghai, aged 81.

Works

References

1938 births
2020 deaths
People from Kunshan
20th-century Chinese historians
East China Normal University alumni
Academic staff of the East China Normal University
21st-century Chinese historians
Historians from Jiangsu